The ‘Biggest Little Game in America’ is an American college football rivalry featuring the Amherst Mammoths (formerly known as the Lord Jeffs) and the Williams Ephs. Both programs play in the Division III New England Small College Athletic Conference (NESCAC). With the exception of a few hiatuses, the series has been played annually since 1884, making it the most played Division III rivalry game, and the fourth most played NCAA game at any level. Williams leads the all-time series 75–56–5.

History

The rivalry between Amherst College and Williams College predates football. It began with the founding of Amherst in 1821. Zephaniah Swift Moore, the president of Williams, had long determined that Williamstown was too remote. Unable to ensure the relocation of the college, he instead set out with a portion of the professors and student body to establish a new school in Amherst, MA. Relations between the two schools have been heated ever since. The two schools, in addition to Wesleyan University, also compete in a series known as the "Little Three," a play on the term "Big Three" traditionally referring to Harvard, Yale, and Princeton.

The November 10, 2007, contest between the two schools in Williamstown was selected as the location for ESPN's College GameDay.  This was the first time the program had been hosted by a Division III school. Additionally, in 2003 the rivalry was included in ESPN's Page 2 bracket of the best college football rivalries.

On November 11, 2017, Williams defeated Amherst in Williamstown. Williams won the game 31–24 in overtime, only the second overtime in the series' history.

Other sports
The first intercollegiate baseball game was played between Amherst and Williams in 1859. In that game, which lasted nearly four hours, Amherst defeated Williams by the score of 73–32.

Game results

See also  
 List of NCAA college football rivalry games

References

College football rivalries in the United States
Amherst Mammoths football
Williams Ephs football
1884 establishments in Massachusetts